Montserrat Gil Torne  (born 9 December 1966) is an Andorran politician in the Liberal Party of Andorra (PLA). Until the 2009 general election she served as Minister for Health, Social Welfare and Family and is a member of the National Executive Committee of the PLA.

References

Members of the General Council (Andorra)
1966 births
Living people
Liberal Party of Andorra politicians
Andorran women in politics
21st-century women politicians